Józef Jerzy Kukuczka (24 March 1948 in Katowice, Poland – 24 October 1989 Lhotse, Nepal) was a Polish alpine and high-altitude climber. Born in Katowice, his family origin is Silesian Goral. On 18 September 1987, he became the second man (after Reinhold Messner), to climb all fourteen eight-thousanders in the world; a feat which took him less than 8 years to accomplish. He is the only person in the world who has climbed two eight-thousanders in one winter. Altogether, he ascended four eight-thousanders in winter, including three as first ascents. Along with Tadeusz Piotrowski, Kukuczka established a new route on K2 in alpine style (the so-called "Polish Line"), which no one has repeated.

Eight-thousanders
Kukuczka is widely considered within the mountaineering community to be one of the best high-altitude climbers in history. He ascended all fourteen eight-thousanders in just seven years, 11 months and 14 days; he held the world record for shortest time span to summit the eight-thousanders for nearly 27 years until May 2014 when Kim Chang-ho beat his mark by one month and eight days. Unlike many prominent high-altitude climbers of his time, the routes Kukuczka chose on the Himalayan giants were usually original, many of them first ascents and often done in the grip of winter wind and cold. During his career, Kukuczka established ten new routes on the eight-thousanders (still a record) and climbed four of these peaks in winter. He was one of an elite group of Polish Himalayan mountaineers (called Ice Warriors), who specialized in winter ascents.

In an era in Poland where even the most basic foods were scarce, Kukuczka was able to successfully mount and equip numerous expeditions to far-flung mountain ranges. Usually pressed for cash and equipment, he painted factory chimneys by rope access (industrial climbing) to earn precious złotys to finance his mountaineering dreams.

He climbed all summits, except for Mount Everest, without the use of supplemental oxygen.

Death
Kukuczka died attempting to climb the unclimbed South Face of Lhotse in Nepal on 24 October 1989. When he lost his footing and fell, the cord was either cut or snapped from the fall, plunging Kukuczka ~2000 metres to his death. Kukuczka's body was never found, but the official version was that he was buried in an icy crevasse near the place of fall. Such a step was dictated by the need to find the body to pay compensation to the deceased's family.

Commemoration
In the hamlet of Wilcze in Istebna in the highlander's summer house Jerzy Kukuczka, there is the Memorial Chamber of Jerzy Kukuczka, created in 1996 by Cecylia Kukuczka (Jerzy's wife).

The mountain "Yak Hotel" in Nepal in Dingboche (4400 m a.s.l.) is named after Jerzy Kukuczka.

The Jerzy Kukuczka Academy of Physical Education is a public university in Katowice that conducts teaching and research in physical education and rehabilitation.

There is also a street in the Gaj district in Wrocław named after him.

See also

 List of eight-thousanders
 Jerzy

Bibliography

References

External links

 Everest History: Jerzy "Jurek" Kukuczka
 Poland.gov.pl: The Crown of the Himalayas
 The legend: 5 stars out of 5 
 Jerzy Kukuczka, il trailer del nuovo film (Italian)
 WinterClimb.com: Jerzy Kukuczka - short biography and list of ascents

Sportspeople from Katowice
1948 births
1989 deaths
Polish mountain climbers
Mountaineering deaths
Polish summiters of Mount Everest
Summiters of all 14 eight-thousanders
Recipients of the Olympic Order
People from Cieszyn County